IPAA can refer to:

 Ileal Pouch-Anal Anastomosis, an alternative name for ileo-anal pouch
 Independent Petroleum Association of America
 Institute of Public Administration Australia
 Intellectual Property Attache Act
 International Peace Arch Association, a non-profit association involved with the maintenance of Peace Arch Park